Camber Sands is a beach in East Sussex, England, in the village of Camber, near Rye. It is the only sand dune system in East Sussex, and is east of the estuary of the River Rother at Rye Bay stretching  to just beyond the Kent border, where shingle and pebbles take over again.  It is one of three stretches of non-tidally submerged sand east of Poole Bay, which just exceeds the three in total length, on England's south coast, the others being West Wittering and Avon Beach. Two holiday resorts are near Camber Sands owned by Pontins and Parkdean Resorts just off New Lydd Road and Lydd Road respectively in the alighting village of Camber.

Dunes
A large section of the western end of the dunes lies within the Camber Sands and Rye Saltings Site of Special Scientific Interest (SSSI), while the rest is designated a Site of Nature Conservation Importance.
The dunes are getting larger by accretion.  The dunes are managed to prevent problems with wind-blown sand.

Second World War and inland to the east
The dunes were fortified and used for exercises in the Second World War. There is a roughly square MoD danger area and base inland of the east of the area.  The dunes resemble topographically those seen in parts of Normandy and challenging desert terrain.  Similar training facilities exist at Braunton in North Devon, in Scotland and in Pembrokeshire.

Transport

Parking
Three main car parks co-exist. Western car park on New Lydd road has a large overflow one, all opposite Central car park and its overflow. A third, smaller car park is on Old Lydd road.

Central has main access to the beach; one can negotiate quite long, steep sandy paths over dunes from Western car park, unsuitable for prams, or wheelchairs. The Western car park closes at 8pm in the summer.

Camber Sands Station
Camber Sands railway station was the terminus of the Rye and Camber Tramway. It opened on 13 July 1908 and closed, with the line, in September 1939.

Sporting activities
The beach has become a popular location for kitesurfing, kite landboarding and kite buggying due to its sand and favourable wind conditions. Kite launches are only allowed in the designated area at the eastern end of the beach near the Jury's Gap car park. There is also an annual professional darts tournament held at the Pontins resort by the British Darts Organisation.

Drownings
In 2016, a total of seven men drowned at Camber Sands, five of them on one day. There was controversy over the lack of lifeguards, and inquests returned verdicts of death by misadventure.

At low tide, remains of a shipwreck can be seen, tentatively identified as the brig "Avon" which sank in 1852.

Cultural references

Camber Sands, with its wide bay and large dune system, has been used in a variety of creative media.

Films
The beach was used in the 1958 film Dunkirk starring John Mills to recreate Operation Dynamo. They were used again as Normandy beaches during D-Day in the 1962 epic The Longest Day.

Follow That Camel was shot here during the early months of 1967, with Camber Sands representing the Sahara Desert, although filming had to be stopped several times because the dunes were covered in snow.

The Monuments Men was shot here in the early part of 2013.

The Invisible Woman (filmed in 2012, released in 2013), a period drama about the life of Nelly Ternan, has several scenes on the sand.

The Theory of Everything, about the life of Stephen Hawking, includes a scene on the sands and dunes.

Scenes from The Loneliness of the Long Distance Runner were filmed here in early 1962. The film's main character (the runner), Colin Smith, portrayed by actor Tom Courtenay, and his friend take their girlfriends to Skegness for a weekend, and some scenes were filmed on this beach and in the dunes.

Television
Camber Sands was featured in Series 2 of Green Wing. Characters Alan Statham and Joanna Clore appear on the beach in the finale and in the Park Resort Holiday Park.

The dunes were featured in a 2010 advertisement for Wall's.

Camber Sands was the planet Aridius in the 1965 Doctor Who story The Chase, and then in 1986 was the filming location for a scene in the final two parts of the story Trial of a Time Lord, as part of an elaborate illusion generated by the Valeyard in the Matrix.

Camber Sands was also featured within the Netflix original series, After Life where Ricky Gervais's character walked his dog in episode 3.

The Inbetweeners episode "Caravan Club" takes place in Camber Sands. The actual caravan site was on the banks on the river Thames at Laleham camping site near Staines.

In S1 E5 of the UK version of Taskmaster, Roisin Conaty talks about moving a boulder to Camber Sands.

Music
Camber Sands is mentioned in "Europe Is Our Playground" (B-side to "Trash") by Suede, "Pulling Mussels (From the Shell)" by Squeeze (also covered by Head Automatica), "Diamonds and Pearls" by The Holloways, "Heavyweight Champion of the World" by Reverend and The Makers and "Caravan" by Nick Heyward. It was also used as a title to Fatboy Slim's EP single Camber Sands. Feeder's 2003 video for "Forget About Tomorrow", was partially shot on the beach. Nine years later, Feeder later referenced Camber Sands in "Oh My", the opening track of their Generation Freakshow album.

The song "On Camber Sands" appears on Gordon Giltrap's album Troubadour, and is a common feature in his live sets. Jose Vanders refers to Camber Sands in her song "For Now".

The cover of the 1980 LP record Beat Boys In The Jet Age by mod revival band, The Lambrettas, was photographed on Camber Sands.

The cover of the Bucks Fizz album I Hear Talk, was photographed at Camber Sands.

Paul McCartney and his band Wings filmed the music video for their Back to the Egg album track "Baby's Request" at Camber Sands in 1979. This was shown as part of their 1981 TV special, on BBC 1, featuring many videos recorded entirely in the Sussex area to accompany the tracks.

The cover of Dream Theater's 1997 album Falling Into Infinity was photographed at Camber Sands by English graphic designer Storm Thorgerson.

The Fall mention Camber Sands in a song called "(We Are) Mod Mock Goth": "We take Viagra / And go to Camber Sands / Our shirts are well out of our pants / We are mod mock goth".

The music video for Gabrielle Aplin's 2012 song "Home" was shot in and around Camber Sands.

The music video for "White Coats" by Foxes, released in 2012, was partially shot on Camber Sands beach.

Music festival All Tomorrow's Parties takes place at Pontins holiday camp in Camber Sands. It was founded by Barry Hogan in 1999 as an alternative to larger, more corporate festivals like Reading, with a tendency towards post-rock, avant-garde, and underground hip hop, along with more traditional rock fare.

Throbbing Gristle released a 2019 2-disc CD live album on the Mute record label called "A souvenir of Camber Sands".

Visual art
Artists the Boyle Family famously made some of their first casts using resin and fibreglass on the beach at Camber Sands in 1966. These initial studies - some of which were unsuccessful - culminated in the Tidal Series of 1969 in which 14 separate casts were made of the same  area of beach. Made over a period of one week, the pieces showed in microscopic detail the way in which the tide affected the sand as it washed over the beach twice a day.

References

Seaside resorts in England
Dunes of England
Sites of Special Scientific Interest in East Sussex
Beaches of East Sussex